Trojka (formerly STV3) was a Slovak television channel owned and operated by RTVS. It ended on December 1st, 2022 at 12:00 AM CET.

History
It was originally launched in 2008 as a sports channel. Due to the financial problems of RTVS at the time, Trojka ended its broadcasting on June 30, 2011. It was revived on 22 December 2019 as a channel showing archived content from RTVS and its predecessors STV and ČST for an older audience. It was then ended by RTVS on November 30, 2022.

Final day on air
On November 30, 2022, Trojka announced the end of the channel itself on that day, causing chaos around the Slovak TV community. After the end of the program Štedrý deň at 12:00 AM on December 1st, the channel stopped airing, and the next morning, anyone who pressed the Text button while viewing Trojka would get a screen that looks like it got wiped out with the only text on the screen being P100. Some days later, RTVS removed teletext from the channel. If you go to the channel to watch it today, you get a screen with the Trojka logo on the left with the text on the right saying the following:

Programová služba
Trojka ukončila
vysielanie
30. novembra 2022.

Ďakujeme za vašu priazeň.

Viac informácií nájdete
na www.rtvs.sk

There will be also a space background if you watch the channel today.
As of December 7, 2022, RTVS removed live broadcasting for Trojka.

Availability 
Satellite: CS Link, Skylink, Digi Slovakia, Magio Sat
Cable: Satro
IPTV: Magio TV, Fiber TV

External links
Official website
A blog post on the official website regarding the shutdown in 2022.

Mass media in Slovakia
Television channels and stations established in 2008
Television channels and stations disestablished in 2011
Radio and Television of Slovakia
2008 establishments in Slovakia
2011 disestablishments in Slovakia
Classic television networks